Andrew Symington (26 June 1785 – 22 September 1853), was a Scottish minister and teacher. He was ordained in 1809. In 1820 he was appointed professor of theology in the Reformed Presbyterian church.

Life
Andrew Symington was born at Paisley on 26 June 1785, the eldest son of a merchant at the Cross, who gave three members of his family to the ministry. He received his early training at Paisley Grammar School, and then proceeded to the University of Glasgow, where he had taken honours in several departments. In 1803 he graduated M.A. He attended the Hall at Stirling for the sessions 1805–7, and was licensed on November 11, 1807. Three calls were soon after offered to him — Glasgow, Water of Urr, and Paisley. He chose his native place, and was ordained there on April 26, 1809.

He was made a D.D. by the Western University of Pennsylvania in 1831, which Glasgow University followed up with the same honour in 1840. In 1811 he was appointed Clerk to the Synod, a post he held till 1822. On the death of his old teacher, John M'Millan, he was called, in 1820, to be Professor of Theology to the denomination. The method he adopted differed from that of his predecessor, for he abandoned expounding the Confession of Faith, and gave lectures on Systematic Theology. When he died, it is said that only six or seven of the missionaries or ministers of the Church had not passed through his hands, while students came from Ireland and America.

With the exception of a few isolated sermons preached on special occasions and one or two introductory biographies to memorial volumes of sermons, he produced little. His Guide for Private Social Prayer, 1823, reached several editions, and the Elements of Divine Truth was published posthumously in 1854. He prepared some of the public documents of the Church.

He died on 22 September 1853- A slight accident had incapacitated him a fortnight before, but his death was unexpected. He met his students in his own house two days before the end. In 1811 he married Jane Stevenson. One of his sons, Andrew, was minister successively at Laurieston and Greenock. His successor  was  George  Glazy,  who was  ordained  3  October, 1854.

Family
By his wife, Jane Stevenson, of Crookedholm, Riccarton, Ayrshire, whom he married in 1811, he had fourteen children, of whom three sons and three daughters survived him.

He married, 18 December 1811, Jane (died 1836) daughter of Robert Stevenson, Esq of Shudderflat, and had issue
Margaret, Marion
William. (married, died without issue) 
James, died unmarried
Margaret
Marion
Isabella
Jane
Robert, electrician in Glasgow, emigrated to Canada (married Margaret D. Orr)
Andrew, died young
Margaret
Jane Stevenson
Andrew, R.P.C, Greenock

Publications
Besides numerous tracts and sermons, Symington wrote:
‘The Martyr's Monument,’ Paisley, 1847.
‘Elements of Divine Truth,’ Edinburgh, 1854, 8vo.

He also contributed ‘The Unity of the Heavenly Church’ (1845) to ‘Essays on Christian Union,’ wrote memoirs of Archibald Mason and Thomas Halliday, which are prefixed to the collected editions of their discourses, and supplied an article on the Reformed Presbyterian church to the ‘Cyclopædia of Religious Denominations,’ 1853, 8vo.

The  God  of  Paul's  Fathers.     A  sermon.     1813.
The  Dismission,  Rest,  and  Future  Glory  of  the  Good  and Faithful  Servant.  A  sermon  preached  on  the  death  of  the Rev.  Archibald  Mason,  D.D.     1832.
The  Blood  of  Faithful  Martyrs  precious  in  the  sight  of  the Lord.     A  sermon.     1834.
The  Child  Jesus.     A  sermon.     1839.
Private  Social  Prayer.     A  sermon.     1840.
Death  Swallowed  up  in  Victory;  a  sermon  preached  on the  death  of  the  Rev.  William  Goold,  senior  minister  of the Reformed  Presbyterian  Congregation,  Edinburgh.  Published by  request.     Third  edition.     Edinburgh,  1844.
The  Martyr's  Monument.  A  Brief  View  of  the  Principles and  character  of  the  Scottish  Martyrs.     Paisley,  1847.
On  Intemperance.     A  sermon
Guide  to  Private  Social  Prayer
Essay  on  the  Unity  of  the  Heavenly  State.
Tract  on  the  Sabbath.
Lecture  on  the  Claims  of  the  Church  and  Society  on  Young Men.     Glasgow,  1850.
Memoir  of  the  Rev.  Thomas  Halliday,  Airdrie.  Prefixed to  his  Discourses.
Elements  of  Divine  Truth.  A  series  of  Lectures  on  Christian Theology  to  Sabbath  School  Teachers.  8vo. Edinburgh.    1854.     Posthumous.

References

Citations

Sources

External links
 

Covenanters
19th-century Scottish clergy
Ministers of the Reformed Presbyterian Church of Scotland